The 73rd Field Artillery Regiment is a field artillery regiment of the United States Army.

History
The 73rd field artillery regiment is believed to be an arm of the Field Artillery Branch (United States) which was founded on November 17, 1775, by the Continental Congress, and was based in West Germany between 1963 and 1975

The 4th Battalion, 73rd Artillery was deployed to help suppress the April 1968 Baltimore riots.

Distinctive unit insignia

 Description:  A gold color metal and enamel device 1 1/8 inches (2.86 cm) in height overall consisting of a shield blazoned: Gules, a lightning flash in bend Or.
 Symbolism:  The scarlet background represents the Field Artillery, while the gold lightning bolt symbolizes the speed and power of the Armored Artillery.
 Background:  The distinctive unit insignia was originally approved for the 73rd Armored Field Artillery Battalion on 17 March 1943and re-designated for the 73rd Artillery Regiment on 5 December 1957 It was amended to include the description on 4 September 1959. The insignia was re-designated effective 1 September 1971, for the 73rd Field Artillery Regiment

Coat of arms

Blazon
 Shield
Gules, a lightning flash in bend Or.
 Crest
On a wreath Or and Gules, issuing from a snowbank Proper behind a caltrop Azure, the Dexter and sinister points each surmounting in base a caltrop counter bend-wise of the first, two cubit arms grasping the halves of a spear broken chevron-wise of the first.
Motto
SPEED AND POWER ALWAYS.
Symbolism
 Shield
The scarlet is for the Field Artillery, the gold lightning bolt is symbolic of the speed and power of the Armored Artillery.
Crest
The design of the crest alludes primarily to the 73rd Artillery's participation in the 1944 winter counter offensive against Germany and is symbolized by the caltrops (a heraldic military device used to impede and delay the movements of the enemy). The two smaller caltrops allude to St. Vith and Echternock, and the larger to Bastogne, the later is blue in reference to the Distinguished Unit Citation awarded the battalion for its role in the defense of Bastogne. The snow refers to the severe winter weather during the period the battalion made its stand against the German counter offensive and is symbolized by two arms breaking a spear. Had it not been for this delaying action the Germans would have taken Bastogne before the 101st Airborne Division arrived.
 Background
The coat of arms was originally approved for the 73rd Armored Field Artillery Battalion on 17 March 1943. It was re-designated for the 73rd Artillery Regiment on 5 December 1957. It was amended to include the description of the shield on 4 September 1959. It was amended to include a crest and motto on 8 January 1965. The insignia was re-designated effective 1 September 1971, for the 73rd Field Artillery Regiment.

Current configuration

 1st Battalion 73rd Field Artillery Regiment (United States)
 2nd Battalion 73rd Field Artillery Regiment (United States)
 3rd Battalion 73rd Field Artillery Regiment (United States)
 4th Battalion 73rd Field Artillery Regiment (United States)
 5th Battalion 73rd Field Artillery Regiment (United States)
 6th Battalion 73rd Field Artillery Regiment (United States)

See also
 Field Artillery Branch (United States)

References

 https://web.archive.org/web/20110722213511/http://www.tioh.hqda.pentagon.mil/Heraldry/ArmyDUISSICOA/ArmyHeraldryUnit.aspx?u=3450

External links
 http://www.history.army.mil/html/forcestruc/lineages/branches/fa/default.htm

073
Military units and formations established in 1918